Sladenia celastrifolia is a species of tree in the family Sladeniaceae found in southwestern China (Yunnan and Guizhou), Thailand, and Myanmar.

References

Sladeniaceae
Trees of Indo-China